The Bouncing Stones site or beach is in the Daintree National Park in the far north of Queensland, Australia. The site is sacred to the Kuku Yalanji Aboriginals of the area and was an area where the women of the tribe discussed their secret women's business. The site takes its name because stones can be bounced off one another in a similar fashion to bouncing balls.

The Leyland brothers TV series visited this beach in one of their episodes.

See also
 Singing sand
 Sailing stones

External links
 Article by Jenna Kochmer in A Broad View Magazine

Landforms of Far North Queensland
Tourist attractions in Far North Queensland
Beaches of Queensland